Bethnal Green was a civil parish and a metropolitan borough in the East End of London, England.

It was formed as a civil parish in 1743 from the Bethnal Green hamlet in Stepney ancient parish, and the church of St Matthew, Bethnal Green, was dedicated in 1746.

The vestry became an electing authority to the Metropolitan Board of Works in 1855 and in 1889 it became part of the County of London. In the 1900 reform of local government caused by the London Government Act 1899 the parish became a metropolitan borough which bordered Hackney, Poplar, Stepney and Shoreditch. In 1965 it was abolished and merged into the London Borough of Tower Hamlets.

Origins

Until 1743 Bethnal Green formed a hamlet within the large parish of Stepney. By the 17th century the settlement had achieved a measure of self-government, with its own overseer, constable and beadle. It remained a rural area until the beginning of the 18th century, when the expansion of suburban London saw the development of the Brick Lane area in the south west of the hamlet. The population rapidly increased and in 1743 an act of parliament constituted Bethnal Green as a separate parish. 
As well as forming a parish for ecclesiastical purposes, Bethnal Green was also created a civil parish with responsibility for relief of the poor and maintenance of highways. The government of the parish was shared by a vestry, governors of the poor and two separate bodies of trustees. A further board of paving and lighting commissioners were established in 1843.

In 1855 the parish was included within the area of the Metropolitan Board of Works to which it nominated one member and the various local government bodies were replaced by a single incorporated vestry which consisted of 48 elected vestrymen.

Under the Metropolis Management Act 1855 any parish that exceeded 2,000 ratepayers was to be divided into wards; as such the incorporated vestry of St Matthew Bethnal Green was divided into four wards (electing vestrymen): No. 1 or East (9), No. 2 or North (9), No. 3 or West (15) and No. 4 or South (15).

In 1889 the Metropolitan Board was replaced by the London County Council, and Bethnal Green was formally removed from Middlesex to the new County of London.

Ecclesiastical parish 
Bethnal Green was part of the ancient parish of St Dunstan's, Stepney, in the Diocese of London; in 1743 the area was split off to form a new parish dedicated to St Matthew.
From 1837, as the population of Bethnal Green increased, a number of new parishes were formed:
 St John, Bethnal Green, in 1837
 St Peter, Bethnal Green, in 1843
 St Andrew, Bethnal Green, in 1843
 St Philip, Bethnal Green, in 1843 
 St James the Less, Bethnal Green, in 1843
 St Bartholomew, Bethnal Green, in 1844 
 St James the Great, Bethnal Green, in 1844 
 St Jude, Bethnal Green, in 1844 
 St Matthias, Bethnal Green, in 1844 
 St Simon Zelotes, Bethnal Green, in 1844
 St Thomas, Bethnal Green, in 1844 
 St Paul, Bethnal Green, in 1865 
 St Barnabas, Bethnal Green, in 1870

In addition, as the population of neighbouring Shoreditch increased, parts of Bethnal Green parish were included in the new parish of:
 Holy Trinity, Shoreditch, in 1866

Creation of the borough
Under the London Government Act 1899 the various vestries and district boards within the County of London were abolished and replaced by metropolitan borough councils. Accordingly, in 1900, a borough council consisting of a mayor, five aldermen and 30 councillors replaced the vestry. The boundaries of the borough and parish were realigned at the same time.

Bethnal Green Town Hall in Patriot Square was opened in 1910, and extended in 1936–9. The architects were Percy Robinson and William Alban Jones. In 2010 the building was reopened as a hotel; much of the original art deco interior has been retained.

Borough seal
The borough seal depicted a scene based on The Beggar's Daughter of Bednall Green, a poem in Percy’s Reliques of Ancient English Poetry, published in 1765, but probably dating from the era of Elizabeth I. According to the legend related in the poem, a blind beggar living in Bethnal Green was in fact Henry de Montfort, eldest son of Simon de Montfort, having escaped from the field of the Battle of Evesham in 1265. His identity was revealed at the wedding feast of his daughter Bessie. A depiction of the beggar had appeared on the head of the beadle's staff dating from 1690.

Politics

In the first election to the borough council, held on 1 November 1900 the Progressives gained a majority, with 22 of the 30 councillors. The Moderates (supported by the Conservative Party) formed the 8 member opposition group. The Progressives increased their majority to 24 at the 1903 elections, and in 1906 they won all the seats on the council. The Progressives held the council against the Municipal Reform Party until 1919 when the Labour Party gained a majority. Progressives and Liberals regained control at the 1928 election, holding power until 1934.

In 1934, Labour again took control, and from that date held all the seats on the council until the borough's abolition.

For parliamentary elections, Bethnal Green was divided into two constituencies in 1885. Each consisted of two wards of the borough and earlier vestry: 
Bethnal Green North East (north and east wards)
Bethnal Green South West (south and west wards).

In 1950, the borough's representation was decreased to a single constituency of Bethnal Green, which in 1955 was expanded to also include three wards from the neighbouring Metropolitan Borough of Hackney.

Population and area
It included the districts now known as Bethnal Green, Cambridge Heath, Bow, Whitechapel and Shoreditch, stretching to include part of the Boundary Estate in the west and parts of Mile End Park and Victoria Park in the east. In the south its boundary stopped just short of The Blind Beggar pub on Whitechapel Road. The populations recorded in National Censuses were:

Bethnal Green Vestry 1801-1899

Metropolitan Borough 1900-1961

Second World War
During World War II, the Borough suffered from heavy aerial bombing. 
It is estimated that 80 tons of bombs fell on this area alone, affecting 21,700 houses, destroying 2,233 and making a further 893 uninhabitable. During the course of the aerial bombardment, 555 people were killed, and 400 were seriously injured.

References

Further reading

External links
MB Bethnal Green (A Vision of Britain) archived.

Parishes governed by vestries (Metropolis)
Metropolitan boroughs of the County of London
History of the London Borough of Tower Hamlets
Former civil parishes in London
1900 establishments in the United Kingdom
1965 disestablishments in the United Kingdom
Districts abolished by the London Government Act 1963
Bills of mortality parishes
Metropolitan Borough of